The Roman Catholic Diocese of Rockville Centre is a Latin Church ecclesiastical territory or diocese of the Catholic Church that comprises the territory of Nassau and Suffolk counties on Long Island in the U.S. state of New York, except for Fishers Island, which is part of Suffolk County but is included in the Diocese of Norwich, Connecticut. Founded in 1957, this diocese was created from territory that once belonged to the Diocese of Brooklyn.

, it the sixth-largest Catholic diocese in the United States, currently serving approximately 1.5 million people in 134 parishes. The diocese is named for the village where its cathedral, St. Agnes Cathedral, is located, Rockville Centre in Nassau County. The fifth and current bishop is John Barres. The Diocese of Rockville Centre is a suffragan diocese in the ecclesiastical province of the metropolitan Archdiocese of New York.

History
The Diocese of Rockville Centre was split off from the Diocese of Brooklyn April 6, 1957. St. Agnes Cathedral is the seat of the Diocese of Rockville Centre. (Fishers Island is part of Suffolk County but is included in the diocese of Norwich, Connecticut.)

Walter P. Kellenberg, former Bishop of Ogdensburg, served as first bishop of the diocese from 1957 to 1976. He founded the diocese's Catholic Charities office in 1957.  Kellenberg was followed by Bishop John McGann, who retired in 2000 and died in 2002.  The diocese was led briefly by Bishop James T. McHugh, who died of cancer on December 10, 2000.

William Murphy served as the diocese's fourth bishop from 2001 to 2017.  Murphy arrived in Long Island from his native Archdiocese of Boston, where he served as the archdiocese's vicar general. He was succeeded by John Barres on January 31, 2017.

The Diocese of Rockville Centre currently has no active seminaries within its territory. Its major seminary, the Seminary of the Immaculate Conception in Lloyd Harbor, ceased its seminary program in 2012. In 1984 the Diocese's minor seminary, St. Pius X Preparatory Seminary in Uniondale closed. In 2012 through an inter-diocesan agreement largely made due to the shrinking number of priestly vocations and resources, the Archdiocese of New York, the Diocese of Brooklyn and the Diocese of Rockville Centre, merged their seminary programs. The agreement outlined that the minor seminary programs would be facilitated at the Cathedral Seminary House of Formation in Douglaston, Queens and the major seminary programs would be facilitated at St. Joseph's Seminary in Yonkers, Westchester County, NY.

Reports of sex abuse and bankruptcy
By August 2019, 68 clergy who served in the Diocese of Rockville Centre were "credibly accused" of committing acts of sex abuse. Some were either convicted for their crimes or agreed to pay financial settlements. Former priest Robert E. Guglielmone, who was later appointed Bishop of the Roman Catholic Diocese of Charleston in South Carolina, was also revealed to have been named as a defendant in a sex abuse lawsuit in the state of New York and is accused of committing acts of sex abuse while serving in the Diocese of Rockville Centre.

On May 8, 2020, New York Governor Andrew Cuomo extended the 2019 New York Child Victims Act's statute of limitation deadline to file sex abuse lawsuits from August 14, 2020 to January 14, 2021.
On May 13, 2020, a Nassau County Supreme Court justice allowed pending lawsuits against the Diocese of Rockville Centre to proceed after rejecting claims that the New York Child Victims Act, which serves as the legal basis for the upcoming sex abuse lawsuits, violated due process. In June 2020, the Diocese of Rockville Centre, which also suffered significant financial damage from the COVID-19 pandemic, filed court documents which stated that the Diocese will file for bankruptcy if there is no pause in nearly 100 pending sex abuse lawsuits.

On October 1, 2020, the diocese of Rockville Center became the fourth diocese in New York state to file for bankruptcy as a result of the sexual abuse litigations.

An April 15 2021 bankruptcy filing documents allegations against some former priests who hadn’t previously been publicly accused of abuse. In total, the Diocese listed 101 accused clergy members, though a committee of unsecured creditors has published 46 more names

Bishops

Bishops of Rockville Centre
 Walter P. Kellenberg (1957–1976)
 John R. McGann (1976–2000)
 James T. McHugh (2000; coadjutor bishop 1998–2000)
 William F. Murphy (2001–2017)
 John O. Barres (2017–present)

Current auxiliary bishops
 Andrzej Jerzy Zglejszewski (2014–present)
 Robert J. Coyle (2018–present; previously Auxiliary Bishop of the Archdiocese for the Military Services, USA, 2013–2018)
 Luis Miguel Romero Fernández (2020–present)

Former auxiliary bishops
 Vincent John Baldwin (1962–1979)
 John R. McGann (1970–1976), appointed Bishop of this diocese
 Gerald Augustine John Ryan (1977–1985) 
 James Joseph Daly (1977–1996) 
 Alfred John Markiewicz (1986–1994), appointed Bishop of Kalamazoo
 Emil Aloysius Wcela (1988–2007)
 John Charles Dunne (1988–2013)
 Paul Henry Walsh (2003–2012) 
 Peter Anthony Libasci (2007–2011), appointed Bishop of Manchester
 Nelson J. Perez (2012–2017), appointed Bishop of Cleveland, later Archbishop of Philadelphia
 Robert J. Brennan (2012–2019), appointed Bishop of Columbus, later Bishop of Brooklyn
 Richard Garth Henning (2018–2023), appointed Coadjutor Bishop of the Diocese of Providence, Rhode Island.

Other priests of this diocese who became bishops
Robert E. Guglielmone, appointed Bishop of Charleston in 2009
William Edward Koenig, appointed Bishop of Wilmington in 2021

Coat of Arms

Media
Catholic Faith Network, formerly known as "Telecare" was founded in 1969 by Monsignor Thomas Hartman of the Diocese of Rockville Centre in New York. CFn's programming includes live religious services, talk shows, devotional programs, educational programming, entertainment, and children's programs. It also presents coverage of special events at the Vatican and of papal journeys. It serves subscribers in three states.

In 2012 the diocesan weekly newspaper Long Island Catholic switched to a subscription-based monthly magazine.

Educational institutions

Seminary
 Seminary of the Immaculate Conception- established in 1926, seminary program ceased in 2012. The major seminary for the Diocese of Rockville Centre since 2012 is now St. Joseph's Seminary in Yonkers, NY.

High schools
As of 2019, there were nine Catholic high schools on Long Island.
Diocesan
 Holy Trinity Diocesan High School, (Hicksville)- established 1966, 
 St. John the Baptist Diocesan High School, (West Islip)- established 1966
 St. Pius X Preparatory Seminary, (Uniondale)- established 1961 and closed in 1984
 Bishop McGann-Mercy Diocesan High School, (Riverhead) established in 1956 by the Sisters of Mercy and closed in June 2018)

Private
 Academy of Saint Joseph, (Brentwood)- established in 1856 and Closed June 2009. Staffed by the Sisters of St. Joseph
 Chaminade High School, (Mineola)- operated and staffed by the Marianists Fathers and Brothers
 Kellenberg Memorial High School, (Uniondale)- established in 1987. Staffed by the Marianists Fathers and Brothers
 Our Lady of Mercy Academy, (Syosset)- established in 1928, operated and staffed by the Sisters of Mercy
 Sacred Heart Academy, (Hempstead)- established in 1949, operated and staffed by the Sisters of St. Joseph Brentwood
 St. Anthony's High School, (South Huntington)- established in 1933, operated and staffed by the Franciscan Brothers of Brooklyn
 St. Dominic High School, (Oyster Bay)- established in 1928
 St. Mary's High School, (Manhasset)- established in 1949, staffed by the Dominican Sisters of Mary, Mother of the Eucharist

Catholic Charities
Catholic Charities of the Diocese of Rockville Centre began operating in 1957. In 1974, they opened a residence for the developmentally disabled in Valley Stream. As of 2019, there were thirteen such residences. A shelter for single mothers opened in 1968 and in 2009 expanded to include transitional housing. Catholic Charities is the one largest provider of affordable senior housing on Long Island, operating over 1,300 units.

Catholic Health
Catholic Health, formerly Catholic Health Services of Long Island, was founded in 1997 and operates under the sponsorship of the Diocese of Rockville Centre. CHS operates six hospitals: Good Samaritan Hospital Medical Center in West Islip, Mercy Medical Center in Rockville Centre, Saint Catherine of Siena Medical Center in Smithtown, Saint Charles Hospital in Port Jefferson, Saint Francis Hospital and Heart Center in Roslyn, and Saint Joseph Hospital in Bethpage. The health system is the primary clinical affiliate and major teaching site of New York Institute of Technology College of Osteopathic Medicine. With 17,000 employees, CHS is the third-largest employer on Long Island. In 2021, CHSLI's name was changed to Catholic Health to reflect an expanded range of services and its connection to the medical school.

Cemeteries
In 2016 the Diocese created a new corporation, Catholic Cemeteries of Long Island, to assume ownership of its cemeteries.

There are four major cemeteries administered by Catholic Cemeteries of Long Island:

 Cemetery of the Holy Rood in Westbury
 Queen of Peace Cemetery in Old Westbury
 Queen of All Saints Cemetery in Central Islip
 Holy Sepulchre Cemetery in Coram

In addition, there are 21 parish churches within the diocese, 6 of which are managed by Catholic Cemeteries of Long Island, and the remainder by the individual parishes.

St. Charles / Resurrection Cemeteries, despite being located in East Farmingdale, is administered by the Diocese of Brooklyn rather than Rockville Centre.

References

External links 
The Roman Catholic Diocese of Rockville Centre Official Site

 
Christian organizations established in 1957
1957 establishments in New York (state)
Rockville Centre
Rockville Centre
Companies that filed for Chapter 11 bankruptcy in 2020